Abbey Mill, or Abbey Mills, is a ruined former watermill on the Holy Brook, a channel of the River Kennet in the English county of Berkshire. The ruins are grade II listed.

The mill originally belonged to Reading Abbey, whose monks are believed to have created the Holy Brook as a water supply to this and other mills owned by them. It is situated just to the south of the ruins of the Abbey itself, in the centre of the town of Reading.

The mill was built straddling the Holy Brook which marked the southern boundary of the monastic enclosure. It continued to grind corn into the 1950s. Today, all that remains is a section of wall, pierced by three arches. The wall is built of flint with caen stone ashlar dressings and brick filling. The two side arches are round headed, whilst the centre arch over the Holy Brook is larger and pointed.

See also
List of watermills in the United Kingdom

References

External links

Grade II listed buildings in Reading
History of Reading, Berkshire
Ruins in Berkshire
Watermills in Berkshire